Ambivali Tarf Tungaratan is a census town in Raigad district  in the state of Maharashtra, India.

Demographics
 India census, Ambivali Tarf Tungaratan had a population of 6796. Males constitute 55% of the population and females 45%. Ambivali Tarf Tungaratan has an average literacy rate of 73%, higher than the national average of 59.5%; with 59% of the males and 41% of females literate. 15% of the population is under 6 years of age.

References

Cities and towns in Raigad district